Municipality of Mocorito is a municipality in Sinaloa in northwestern Mexico.

References

Municipalities of Sinaloa